Robert H. Lustig (born 1957) is an American pediatric endocrinologist. He is Professor emeritus of Pediatrics in the Division of Endocrinology at the University of California, San Francisco (UCSF), where he specialized in neuroendocrinology and childhood obesity. He is also director of UCSF's WATCH program (Weight Assessment for Teen and Child Health), and president and co-founder of the non-profit Institute for Responsible Nutrition.

Lustig came to public attention in 2009 when one of his medical lectures, "Sugar: The Bitter Truth," was aired. He is the editor of Obesity Before Birth: Maternal and Prenatal Influences on the Offspring (2010), and author of Fat Chance: Beating the Odds against Sugar, Processed Food, Obesity, and Disease (2013).

Biography
Lustig grew up in Brooklyn, New York, and attended Stuyvesant High School in Manhattan. He obtained a bachelor's degree from the Massachusetts Institute of Technology in 1976 and an MD from Cornell University Medical College in 1980.

His pediatric residency was completed at St. Louis Children's Hospital in 1983 and his clinical fellowship in pediatric endocrinology at UCSF the following year. After this he worked at Rockefeller University for six years as a post-doctoral fellow and research associate in neuroendocrinology. Before returning to UCSF in 2001, he was a faculty member at the University of Tennessee, Memphis, and the University of Wisconsin-Madison, and worked at St. Jude Children's Research Hospital in Memphis. In 2013 he completed a Master of Studies in Law (MSL) from UC Hastings College of the Law.

Lustig has authored 105 peer-reviewed articles and 65 reviews. He is a former chair of the obesity task force of the Pediatric Endocrine Society, a member of the obesity task force of the Endocrine Society, and sits on the steering committee of the International Endocrine Alliance to Combat Obesity. He is married with two daughters and lives in San Francisco.

Publications
Lustig's publications discussed a proposed toxic effect of dietary fructose — a component of sucrose (table sugar), honey, fruit and some vegetables – on the development of obesity. In the early 21st century, Lustig believed that the liver is damaged by fructose in table sugar and high-fructose corn syrup used in manufactured food and beverages (particularly convenience food and soft drinks), and by fructose in fruit juice and vegetable juice. His position was that sugars are not simply empty calories, and rejected the idea that "a calorie is a calorie."

Lustig was a coauthor of the 2009 American Heart Association guideline on sugar intake, which recommended that women consume no more than 100 calories daily from added sugars and men no more than 150.

Reception
Lustig's statements regarding fructose as a "poison" and the primary cause of weight gain have been disputed because claims of fructose toxicity are unproven. Excessive consumption of fructose-containing beverages is likely a cause of weight gain and obesity in many people due to the additional caloric intake rather than a specific toxic effect of fructose. Fructose  when consumed in excess as a sweetening agent in foods and beverages  is associated with surplus calories and greater risk of obesity, diabetes, and cardiovascular disorders as components of metabolic syndrome. Other reviews indicate that fructose has no specific adverse effects compared to any other carbohydrate.

Some researchers state that Lustig's YouTube lecture 'Sugar: the bitter truth' was amplified by increased internet use by the public.

Selected works
Books
(2010) Obesity Before Birth: Maternal and Prenatal Influences on the Offspring. Boston: Springer Science.
(2013) Fat Chance: Beating the Odds against Sugar, Processed Food, Obesity, and Disease. New York: Hudson Street Press.
(2013) Sugar Has 56 Names: A Shopper's Guide, Avery.
(2014) with Heather Millar, The Fat Chance Cookbook, Thorndike Press.
(2017) "The Hacking of the American Mind", Avery.
(2021) Metabolical: The Lure and Lies of Processed Food, Nutrition, and Modern Medicine. New York: Harper Wave. 

Articles

See also
Epidemiology of metabolic syndrome
Epidemiology of obesity
Fed Up (documentary featuring Lustig, 2014)
Metabolic disorder

References

External links
 Robert Lustig, MD, University of California, San Francisco.
 "Robert Lustig, Talks at Google", August 2, 2011.
 "Fat Chance: Fructose 2.0", University of California Television, October 21, 2013 (lecture by Lustig updating "Sugar: The Bitter Truth").
 Connor, Anahad. "Learning to Cut the Sugar", The New York Times, February 19, 2014 (interview).
 Donovan, John. "Sugar Wars", ABC Nightline, March 18, 2010 (interview).
 Ferdman, Roberto A. "Explained: The actual difference between sugar and high-fructose corn syrup", The Washington Post, April 1, 2015.

Living people
Low-carbohydrate diet advocates
Massachusetts Institute of Technology alumni
University of California, San Francisco faculty
Weill Cornell Medical College alumni
American pediatric endocrinologists
1957 births